WWE Bottom Line is an American syndicated television program which recaps the events which takes place on WWE's weekly flagship program, Raw. It replaced WWE's previous syndicated highlight show, WWF LiveWire. Its name is a reference to the same catchphrase used by WWE legend, Stone Cold Steve Austin.

The show was originally broadcast domestically in the United States from May 24, 2002  to September 2005, when it was removed from domestic syndication. Following this, Bottom Line was and still is broadcast in international markets to fulfil programming commitments. It is broadcast in Italy on Dplay Plus, in Spain on GOL, in Philippines on Solar Sports. In South Africa WWE Bottom Line airs on eKasi+ on Tuesdays at 10.00pm with a repeat the following Friday afternoon at 1.30pm.

On February 16, 2008, Bottom Line celebrated its 300th episode, just as its sister show Afterburn did on the next morning. On the December 17, 2011, Bottom Line celebrated its 500th episode, airing the 2011 Slammy Award matches and awards presentation. On July 22, 2021, Bottom Line celebrated its 1000th episode.

Hosts

Fill in guest hosts

Broadcast
WWE Bottom Line was broadcast in the United States from May 2002 to September 2005 when it was removed from syndication, however it still airs in international markets to fulfill programming commitments.

See also

WWE Afterburn
List of current WWE programming

References

External links

Bottom Line
Bottom Line
2002 American television series debuts
2010s American television series
First-run syndicated television programs in the United States
English-language television shows